Mohammed Ali al-Hasani was the governor of Iraq's southern Al Muthanna province until he was killed by a roadside bomb on August 20, 2007. He was a member of the Supreme Islamic Iraqi Council (SIIC), one of the biggest Shia party in Iraq, whose armed wing is the Badr Organization. Al Diwaniyah governor Khalil Jalil Hamza, who was also a member of SIIC, was killed along with the province's police chief Major General Khaled Hassan earlier on August 11, 2007.

References

External links
Iraqi provincial governor killed

Iraq governor dies in bomb attack
Roadside Bomb Kills Iraqi Governor

2007 deaths
Assassinated Iraqi politicians
Governors of Muthanna Governorate
Iraqi terrorism victims
Iraqi Shia Muslims
Terrorism deaths in Iraq
Islamic Supreme Council of Iraq politicians
Year of birth missing